Sir Peter Beckford (1740–1811) of Iwerne Stepleton in Dorset, was a British landowner, huntsman, writer, collector and the patron of the Classical composer and pianist Muzio Clementi. He kept his own pack of hounds and his 1781 work Thoughts upon Hunting is a classic and authoritative detailed guide to foxhunting.

Biography
Peter Beckford was born the only son of Julines Beckford of Iwerne Stepleton, Dorset in 1740. He was a nephew of William Beckford, Lord Mayor of the City of London, and cousin of William Thomas Beckford (1760–1844), author of the Gothic novel Vathek and builder of the folly Fonthill Abbey. 

In 1765, on the death of his father, Beckford inherited his estate at Stepleton House in the parish of Iwerne Stepleton near Blandford Forum in Dorset, and set out on his first visit to Italy. On the way he met Voltaire and Rousseau at Geneva, and hunted with the king of Savoy. In 1766 he visited Rome, where he was escorted by James Byres, bought several antiquities, and commissioned a modern portrait (probably the portrait of Beckford by Pompeo Batoni). There he was so impressed by the young Muzio Clementi's musical talent that he persuaded Clementi's father to let him take Clementi to his estate in Britain for seven years. Beckford agreed to provide quarterly payments to sponsor Muzio's musical education until the boy reached the age of 21. (Beckford himself claimed to have "bought Clementi from his father for a period of seven years".)

He became the Member of Parliament for Morpeth, Northumberland in 1768.

On 22 March 1773 Beckford married Hon. Louisa Pitt (1754–1791), the daughter of the British diplomat and politician George Pitt, 1st Baron Rivers (1721–1803) and Penelope Atkins. Their first son was born on 9 September 1776 but survived only a few months; Beckford's first surviving son was Horace, born at Sudeley Castle on 2 December 1777.

Beckford was an enthusiastic hunter, and in 1781 published his Thoughts upon Hunting In a Series of Familiar Letters to a Friend.

In 1783, on the deterioration of his wife's health, Beckford returned to Italy with his family. His wife and a young daughter died at Florence; and he returned to Britain in 1799.

In 1805 he published his Familiar Letters from Italy to a Friend in England.

He died in 1811, and is buried in Steepleton Iwerne church.

Writings 
Familiar letters from Italy, to a friend in England (2 vols., 1805)
Thoughts upon hunting : in a series of familiar letters to a friend, 1781
Thoughts upon hunting, in a series of familiar letters to a friend, 1781
Thoughts upon Hare and Fox Hunting, in a series of letters to a friend, 1781 
Thoughts on Fox Hunting, published 1791

References

External links
 
 National Sporting Library—NSL Collection Highlights—Thoughts on Hunting by Peter Beckford
 www.nsl.org/NSLWinter2002.pdf
 

1740 births
1811 deaths
18th-century English landowners
18th-century English non-fiction writers
Peter
British MPs 1768–1774
English hunters
19th-century English landowners
English male non-fiction writers
English non-fiction writers
English patrons of music
Masters of foxhounds in England
Members of the Parliament of Great Britain for English constituencies
18th-century English male writers
18th-century English writers